Cryptoblepharus aldabrae is a species of lizard in the family Scincidae. It is endemic to the Aldabra Islands.

References

Cryptoblepharus
Reptiles described in 1918
Taxa named by Richard Sternfeld